On 27 October 2020, at least eight people were killed and another 110 injured by an explosion during a class at Sheikh Rahimullah Haqqani's madrasa in Peshawar, Khyber Pakhtunkhwa, Pakistan. Five to six kilograms of explosives were used in the bombing, which took place at the Jamia Zubairia madrasa at 08:30 local time (03:30 GMT).

See also
2014 Peshawar school massacre

References

2020 in Khyber Pakhtunkhwa
2020 murders in Pakistan
2020 school bombing
21st-century mass murder in Pakistan
Attacks on buildings and structures in 2020
2020 school bombing
Building bombings in Pakistan
Improvised explosive device bombings in 2020
2020 school
Mass murder in 2020
2020 school bombing
October 2020 crimes in Asia
School bombings
School massacres in Pakistan
Terrorist incidents in Pakistan in 2020